Members of the Folketing are members of the Danish parliament, known as the Folketing. The title is frequently shortened to the initialism MF.

Since the general election on 22 September 1953, which was the first under the Constitution of 1953, there have been 179 members of parliament in each session. 175 of which are elected in Denmark, two in Greenland, and two elected in the Faroe Islands. Members are elected to serve 4-year terms, although their term may be shortened if a snap election is called.

Longest serving members 

 Klaus Berntsen (51 years)
 Lars Dinesen (48 years)
 Niels Neergaard (43 years)
 Sofus Høgsbro (43 years)
 Bertel Haarder (42 years)

See also 
 Folketing
 List of members of the Folketing, 2022–present

References 

 
Parliamentary titles